Suzanne Arms is an American writer. She has published seven books on childbirth and child care.

Life 

Arms was born in Summit, New Jersey, and grew up on the East Coast of the United States. Her parents were both teachers. She received a BA in literature from the University of Rochester in Rochester, New York. She moved to Marin County, California to work as a teacher in nursery schools and in the Head Start Program.

Work 

Her first book, A Season to be Born, was published in 1973. It was a diary of the birth of her daughter, with photographs by the baby's father, John Arms.

A second book, Immaculate Deception: A New Look at Women and Childbirth in America, appeared in 1975, which became a best-seller, was a New York Times Best Book of the Year; By 1979, it had sold more than 150,000 copies.

Arms has described the precautions against risk in obstetric wards in the West as "just-in-case obstetrics".

In 1978, with six other women, Arms started a birth center, The Birth Place, in Palo Alto, California; it was organized much as she had proposed in her 1975 book. It became a state-licensed facility in the year 1979.

Arms has made documentary films on pregnancy and birth: she shot, directed, and produced Five Women, Five Births in the 1970s; Giving Birth (35') was made in 1998.
She also directed and co-produced the film "Birth" with Christopher Carson, which is critical of the medical-pharmaceutical-hospital approach to birth, proposing a different approach.

Recognition 

Arms has been awarded the Lamaze International Lifetime Achievement Award for her contribution to the field of childbirth.

Books
 Suzanne Arms, John Arms. A Season to Be Born. New York: Harper & Row [1973]
 Suzanne Arms. Immaculate Deception: A New Look at Women and Childbirth in America. Boston: Houghton Mifflin, 1975 (reprinted 1977, 1985)
 To Love and Let Go (1983)
 Adoption: A Handful of Hope (1985)
 Seasons of Change: Growing Through Pregnancy & Birth (1993)
 Immaculate Deception II: Myth, Magic and Birth (1994 & 1997)
 Breastfeeding: How to Breastfeed Your Baby (2004)

References 

American family and parenting writers
1945 births
Living people
American social activists
American photojournalists
Writers from Camden, New Jersey
University of Rochester alumni
American human rights activists
Women human rights activists
American women non-fiction writers
21st-century American women